Yugoslavia manufactured two types of rifle grenade, both with the nomenclature of M60. The M60 anti-personnel rifle grenade bore a resemblance to the French M52 rifle grenade. The M60 anti-tank rifle grenade bore a resemblance to the STRIM 65, also of French origin. It could penetrate 200mm of armour. 

Each was propelled by being mounted atop a rifle's 22 mm grenade launching adapter, and being launched by a ballistite (blank) cartridge.

Sources and references

External links
A crate of Yugoslavian anti-personnel rifle grenades captured from SWAPO in March 1982
Illustration of both grenades mounted on the muzzle of Zastava M70 assault rifles
Article (in Spanish) with reference to several Yugoslav rifle grenades

Weapons of Yugoslavia
Rifle grenades
Anti-tank grenades
Military equipment introduced in the 1970s